Margaret Ruth Pringle Carse (7 December 1916 – 14 November 1999) was a Canadian dancer, educator and choreographer. She founded the Alberta Ballet Company dance company and is considered a pioneer in the field of dance in western Canada.

She was born in Edmonton, Alberta, and trained in Scottish dancing as a child. She went on to study ballet. She performed with Boris Volkoff's company, with the National Ballet of Canada and with the ballet corps of Radio City Music Hall in New York City. After suffering an injury, she was forced to retire from dancing in 1954 and trained as a teacher with Gweneth Lloyd.

Carse returned to Edmonton, where she taught dance and developed choreography for operas and musical theatre there. With Muriel Taylor, she established a small amateur performing company called  Dance Interlude, which was renamed the Edmonton Ballet in 1960 and the Alberta Ballet in 1971. Also in 1971, she established the Alberta Ballet School. She retired as artistic director for the company in 1975, but continued her association with the Alberta Ballet until 1983.

She also developed choreography for television productions and ballets.

In 1992, she was named to the Order of Canada.

Carse died in Ponoka at the age of 82.

In 2016, Ballet Edmonton's dance facility was renamed the Ruth Carse Centre for Dance in her honour. Carse Lane in Edmonton also named in her honour.

References 

1916 births
1999 deaths
Alberta Ballet Company
Ballet teachers
Canadian ballerinas
Canadian choreographers
Canadian female dancers
Members of the Order of Canada
People from Edmonton
Canadian artistic directors
Canadian women choreographers